Kalateh-ye Zanganeh (also Romanized as Kalāteh-ye Zanganeh) is a village in Zaveh Rural District, in the Central District of Zaveh County, Razavi Khorasan Province, Iran. At the 2006 census, its population was 829, in 165 families.

References 

Populated places in Zaveh County